WW domain-containing transcription regulator protein 1 (WWTR1), also known as Transcriptional coactivator with PDZ-binding motif (TAZ), is a protein that in humans is encoded by the WWTR1 gene. WWTR1 acts as a transcriptional coregulator and has no effect on transcription alone. When in complex with transcription factor binding partners, WWTR1 helps promote gene expression in pathways associated with development, cell growth and survival, and inhibiting apoptosis. Aberrant WWTR1 function has been implicated for its role in driving cancers. WWTR1 is often referred to as TAZ due to its initial characterization with the name TAZ. However, WWTR1 (TAZ) is not to be confused with the protein tafazzin, which originally held the official gene symbol TAZ, and is now TAFAZZIN.

Structure 

WWTR1 contains a proline rich region, TEAD binding motif, WW domain, coiled coil region, and a transactivation domain (TAD) containing the PDZ domain-binding motif. WWTR1 (TAZ) lacks a DNA binding domain so it can not directly drive transcription. WWTR1 exhibits conserved structural homology with another transcriptional coregulator, yes-associated protein 1 (YAP). Both YAP and TAZ are able to form homodimers and heterodimers with each other through interactions at the coil coil domain. YAP and TAZ cooperate with transcription factors to promote tissue formation. WWTR1 (TAZ) interacts with a variety of transcriptional partners, including the four TEA domain family members (TEAD1/2/3/4) through the TEAD-binding motif and several other factors containing the PPXY motif, which consists of a Proline-Proline-X (any amino acid)-Tyrosine sequence. Examples of such partners include Runx/PEBP2, AP2, C/EBP, c-Jun, Krox-20, Krox-24, MEF2B, NF-E2, Oct-4 and p73, which interact with WWTR1 via the WW domain.  The transactivation domain at the C-terminal end (amino acids 165–395) was shown to be important in producing transcriptional effects.

Function 

WWTR1 (TAZ) plays an important role in embryogenesis and development, which include regulation of organ size, stem cell renewal, tissue regeneration, osteogenesis, and angiogenesis. These functions are effected through coactivation of transcription factors that promote cell growth, migration, and differentiation, such as the four members of the TEAD transcription factor family, Paired box gene 3 (PAX3), and Runt related transcription factors (RUNX1/2). The proliferative functions of WWTR1 (TAZ) and its paralog, YAP, are restricted by the Hippo signaling pathway. This suppressive pathway consists of a kinase signaling cascade, the core of which is made up of the serine-threonine kinases, STK3/MST2 and STK4/MST1, which when active and complexed with the regulatory protein, SAV1, will phosphorylate and activate the LATS1/2 kinases, which in complex with the regulatory protein, MOB1, phosphorylate and downstream inactivate YAP/TAZ. In this way, Hippo activation arrests cell growth by decreasing proliferative gene expression, leading to decreased cell death by ferroptosis and increased cell death by apoptosis.

Functional Redundancy with Yes Associated Protein (YAP)

Similarities 
WWTR1 (TAZ) has a similar structural sequence and binding motifs to yes-associated protein 1 (YAP). YAP and TAZ are often considered functionally redundant in existing literature. Both play roles in organ size development as well as cell migration, wound healing, angiogenesis, and metabolism, particularly in lipogenesis. Inactivation of YAP and TAZ occurs through phosphorylation by kinases in the Hippo pathway, namely LATS1 and LATS2. This recruits the binding of the regulatory protein, 14-3-3, which prevents YAP/TAZ from localizing to the nucleus and marks it for ubiquitination, which allows it to be recognized for subsequent degradation by proteasomes.

Differences 
TAZ is able to form both heterodimers and heterotetramers with TEADs to initiate transcription (TAZ-TEAD and TAZ-TEAD-TAZ-TEAD), while YAP is only able to form YAP-TEAD heterodimers. These differences impart unique functions to TAZ, such as in the regulation of adipocyte differentiation through interactions with the peroxisome proliferator-activated receptor (PPARγ), as well as osteogenesis through transcriptional coactivation of bone-specific transcription factors, such as RUNX2 (also known as Cbfa1.) Additionally, TAZ independently interacts with Nuclear factor of activated T-cells 5 (NFATC5) in order to repress transcription in renal cells that are undergoing osmotic stress.  Both YAP and TAZ associate with Mothers against decapentaplegic family transcription factors (SMAD) complexes to promote TGF-beta signaling and drive differentiation and development, but upregulation of only TAZ occurs upon transduction of this cascade. TAZ is only able to complex with SMAD2, SMAD3, or SMAD4 to promote nuclear shuttling and transcription, but YAP can also interact with SMAD1 and SMAD7 in addition. In vivo murine studies have demonstrated that animals lacking functional TAZ are more viable than animals lacking YAP expression. In contrast, silencing of YAP contributed to a more dramatic effect on cell expansion, glucose uptake, and cell cycle arrest than TAZ. When assayed in non-small-cell lung cancer (NSCLC) cell lines, WWTR1 maintained the extracellular matrix (ECM) organization and adhesion, and controlled migration more than YAP, which more closely regulated cell division and cell cycle progression genes.

WWTR1 Protein Interactions

Clinical Significance

Roles in Diseases 
WWTR1 has been implicated in many inflammatory diseases, including cancers.

Cancers 
WWTR1 (TAZ) is implicated a wide variety of cancers including melanoma, head and neck squamous cell carcinoma, breast cancer, non-small cell lung cancer, and others due to its high gene and histological expression, as well as correlation with increased metastasis and poorer survival in animal studies and patient data. Along with the structurally similar co-regulator YAP, many studies have described their role in promoting oncogenesis, altering neoplastic metabolism, and generating resistance to therapeutic intervention. In particular, TAZ overexpression conferred resistance to cisplatin chemotherapy as well as immunotherapy treatment with a PD-1 antibody.

Associated Therapeutics 
YAP and TAZ function have been targeted in several therapeutic methods in the treatment of cancers. 

The Hippo signaling agonist, C19, increases the phosphorylation of MST1/2 and LATS1/2, resulting in more downstream inactivation of YAP/TAZ. Modulating extracellular matrix stiffness and tension using thiazovivin, cucurbitacin I, dasatinib, fluvastatin, and pazopanib, exhibited positive results in breast cancer cell lines by preventing YAP/WWTR1 translocation to the nucleus. Endogenous hormonal factors that are synthesized for normal physiological functions such as epinephrine and glucagon have also been demonstrated to have similar inhibitory effects on YAP/TAZ function by promoting Hippo pathway activation. The class of cholesterol inhibitors, statins, was shown to inhibit the Rho family of GTP-ases (Rho-GTPase), which are enzymes that signal for upstream inhibition of  the Hippo pathway, and exhibited similar effects in attenuating growth of breast cancer and human lung adenocarcinoma cells. Statins inhibit 3-hydroxy-3-methyl-glutaryl-coenzyme A reductase (HMG-CoA reductase), which is the precursor to mevalonate in the mevalonate pathway that synthesizes the lipid building blocks that form cholesterols and the lipid chains responsible for anchoring Rho-GTPases to the cell membrane. The Rho-GTPase, Ras Family Homolog A (RhoA), is activated by prenlylation (the posttranslational modification through addition of hydrophobic groups), and is responsible in part for modulating cytoskeletal elements that reduce Hippo pathway activity. By targeting Rho kinases with thiazovivin, or lipid synthesis through the mevalonate pathway, with statins, RhoA is inhibited and increased Hippo kinase activity may limit proliferation driven by YAP/TAZ. Tyrosine kinases signal in proliferative pathways, some which promote YAP/TAZ function, such as Src family kinases and includes the Yes tyrosine kinase, which is associated with YAP function. Targeting tyrosine kinases with inhibitors such as dasatinib and pazopanib has shown some effect in cancers. 

Inhibition of YAP/TAZ function by targeting their interactions with their transcriptional partners in the TEAD family has also been studied. This includes the use of verteporfin, which was investigated in the treatment of skin cancers, particularly melanoma, although it was not taken beyond preclinical studies.

References 

Wikipedia Student Program